Omega is the second studio album by Alyson Avenue, and the band's final album with lead vocalist Anette Olzon. It was released on May 6, 2004, by the label AOR Heaven. It was re-released on July 14, 2009, along with their first album Presence of Mind. Omega II comes with five exclusive bonus tracks with Anette Olzon, and their first single "I Am (Your Pleasuremaker)".

Background 
Before being selected by Nightwish as their lead singer in 2007, Anette Olzon fronted Alyson Avenue a Swedish melodic rock band, subsequently releasing two substantial studio albums. Omega is the second one, originally released in 2004.

Those experienced in the side projects of `Nightwish' members, probably noted Anette's guest appearance on "Brother Firetribe's" second album (AOR band featuring `Nightwish' guitarist and `Leverage' vocalist). The sound of "Alyson Avenue" is fairly similar to that of "...Firetribe" with a significant differentiation in the fact that "...Avenue" is very much guitar oriented melodic hard rock and not as key-driven. In fact the guitar parts are surprisingly thick, incorporating rhythm patterns and solos which remind one of late 80s `Whitesnake' (on their AOR moments).

Track listing 
 When Dreams Fall Apart -4:54
 Tonight Is All You Get - 3:54
 Perfect Love - 4:04	
 One Life One Show - 4:24	
 Do You Ever Miss My Passion - 4:25	
 Echoes of My Heart - 5:24	
 I Still Believe - 4:26
 I Have Been Waiting - 4:52	
 Can I Be Wrong - 3:40	
 Whenever You Need Someone - 4:49
 I Am (Your Pleasuremaker) (2009 re-release bonus track) -5:48
 Hard to Feel Alive (2009 re-release bonus track) - 5:58		
 Fight With Your Heart (2009 re-release bonustrack) - 6:12
 Every Day Is a Trial (2009 re-release bonus track) - 4:33
 Another Night (2009 re-release bonus track) - 3:53

Personnel
Anette Olzon - Vocals
Niclas Olsson - Keyboards
Jarmo Piiroinen - Guitars
Thomas Löyskä - Bass
Roger Landin - Drums

Re-release
Tony Rohtla - Guitars
Fredrik Eriksson - Drums

2004 albums
Alyson Avenue albums